The Nigerian Women's Trust Fund is a non-governmental organization founded in 2011. With the decline in the number of women holding esteem political and social positions in Nigeria, the body aims at addressing gender equality by "increasing representation of women in Nigerian governance at all levels" in line with the National Gender Policy (NGP) of 2006. Currently the representation of women in Nigerian elective and appointive positions is less than 5%, though the Nigerian Women's Trust Fund aims to increase that number to 35% by the 2027 elections.

The organisation was led by Ayisha Osori and she was succeeded by Olufunke Baruwa.

References

External links

2011 establishments in Nigeria
Women's rights organizations
Organizations established in 2011
Human rights organizations based in Nigeria